Love in the Big City refers to:

 Love in the Big City (film) - Russian film
 Love in the Big City (novel) - South Korean novel